Forest of Bliss is a 1986 documentary film by ethnographic filmmaker Robert Gardner about everyday life in Benares, India.

References

External links
Production detailed in Making Forest of Bliss by Gardner and Akos Ostor.
Forest of Bliss
 

1986 films
American documentary films
Anthropology documentary films
Documentary films about India
1986 documentary films
Films set in Uttar Pradesh
Culture of Varanasi
1980s English-language films
1980s American films